Valérie Zenatti (born 1 April 1970, in Nice) is a French writer, translator and screenwriter.

Biography 
Her novel,  enjoyed a critical and public success and - after being selected in the final prix Médicis and prix des libraires – was awarded the prix du Livre Inter in June 2015. and seven other prizes including the Prix Méditerranée, le Prix Libraires en Seine et le prix Azur.

She's also the translator of Aharon Appelfeld into French.

Work

Children/young adult books 
 1999: Une addition, des complications, coll. Neuf
 1999: Une montre pour grandir, illustrations Frédéric Richard, École des loisirs, coll. Mouche
 2000: Koloïshmielnik s’en va-t-en guerre, École des loisirs, coll. Neuf 
 2001: Fais pas le clown, Papa !, illustrations by Kimiko, École des loisirs, coll. Mouche
 2002: Le Secret de Micha, illustrations Alan Metz, École des loisirs, coll. Mouche
 2002: Quand j'étais soldate, École des loisirs, coll. Médium –  2004
 2004: Jonas, poulet libre, illustrations de Nadja, École des loisirs, coll. Mouche
 2004: Demain, la révolution !, École des loisirs, coll. Neuf
 2005: , École des loisirs, coll. Médium
 2007: Boubélé, illustrations Audrey Poussier, École des loisirs, coll. Mouche
 2007: Adieu, mes 9 ans !, École des loisirs, coll. Neuf
 2008: « Une balle perdue », nouvelle dans le recueil collectif Il va y avoir du sport mais moi je reste tranquille, École des loisirs
 2009: Vérité, vérité chérie, illustrations Audrey Poussier, École des loisirs, coll. Mouche
 2010: Le Blues de Kippour with Serge Lask, éd. Naïve

Novels 
 2006 : En retard pour la guerre, éditions de l'Olivier ; Points Seuil sous le titre Ultimatum.
 2010: Les Âmes sœurs, éditions de l'Olivier ; Points Seuil, 2011
 2011: Mensonges, éd. de l'Olivier
 2012: Mariage blanc, éd. du Moteur
 2014: Jacob, Jacob, éd. de l'Olivier ; Points Seuil, 2016 – Prix Méditerranée 2015 et Prix du Livre Inter

Translations 
 From Hebrew to French
 2004:  by Aharon Appelfeld
 2006: L'Amour, soudain by Aharon Appelfeld
 2007: Double Jeu by Yair Lapid
 2008: Floraison sauvage by Aharon Appelfeld
 2008: Sur le vif by Michal Govrin
 2008: La Chambre de Mariana by Aharon Appelfeld
 2009: Un petit garçon idéal by Zeruya Shalev
 2009: Et la fureur ne s'est pas encore tue by Aharon Appelfeld
 2011: Le Garçon qui voulait dormir by Aharon Appelfeld
 2012: Yolanda by Moshé Sakal
 2013: Les Eaux tumultueuses by Aharon Appelfeld
 2014: Adam et Thomas by Aharon Appelfeld
 2015: Les partisans by Aharon Appelfeld

References

External links 
 Valérie Zenatti biographie
 Valérie Zenatti bibliography
 Valérie Zenatti on Babelio
 Valérie Zenatti on École des Loisirs
 Jacob Jacob: Valérie Zenatti, prix du livre Inter 2015 on Le Figaro (8 June 2015)
 Valérie Zenatti rend hommage à son oncle Jacob on L'Express
 Valérie Zenatti on BiblioMonde

21st-century French non-fiction writers
French children's writers
French women children's writers
Translators from Hebrew
Prix du Livre Inter winners
People from Nice
1970 births
Living people
21st-century French women writers
21st-century translators